Daly Waters may refer to:

Daly Waters, Northern Territory, a town and locality in Australia
Daly Waters Airfield, an airfield in the Northern Territory of Australia
Daly Waters frog, species of frog

See also
Daly (disambiguation)